Franz Josef Degenhardt (3 December 193114 November 2011) was a German poet, satirist, novelist, and – first and foremost – a folksinger/songwriter (Liedermacher) with decidedly left-wing politics. He was also a lawyer, bearing the academic degree of Doctor of Law.

Degenhardt was born in Schwelm, Westphalia.  After studying law from 1952 to 1956 in Cologne and Freiburg, he passed the first German state bar examination in 1956 and the second in 1960. In 1961, he worked for the Europa-Institut of the University at Saarbrücken, where he obtained his doctorate in 1966. Degenhardt joined the Social Democratic Party of Germany (SPD) in 1961, but was forced out in 1971 because of his support for the German Communist Party (DKP), which he joined in 1978.

From the early 1960s onward, in addition to practicing law, Degenhardt was also performing and releasing recordings. He is perhaps most famous for his song (and the album of the same name) "Spiel nicht mit den Schmuddelkindern" ("Don't Play With the Grubby Children," 1965), but has released close to 50 albums, starting with Zwischen Null Uhr und Mitternacht ("Between 00:00 and Midnight," 1963), renamed Rumpelstilzchen (original title: Zwischen Null Uhr Null und Mitternacht); his most recent albums Krieg gegen den Krieg ("War against the War") and Dämmerung ("twilight") came out in 2003 and 2006. In 1968, Degenhardt was involved in trials of members of the German student movement, principally defending social democrats and communists. At the same time, he wasin his capacity as a singer-songwriterone of the major voices of the 1968 student movement. In 1972 he translated the song "Here's to You" under the title Sacco und Vanzetti with five new verses. On his 1977 album  he criticized many of his former comrades from that era for what he saw as their betrayal of socialist ideals and shift towards a social-liberal orientation. The album's title (roughly, "man with velour coat") mocks the style of clothing they had supposedly adopted.

Notably, the songs on Degenhardt's 1986 album Junge Paare auf Bänken ("Young Couples on the Benches"), along with the song Vorsicht Gorilla! ("Beware of Gorilla") on the 1985 album of the same name, are his translations into German of chansons by the French singer-songwriter Georges Brassens, spiritually perhaps one of his closest musical allies.

Degenhardt has also written several novels, most in a rather autobiographical vein, among others:  ("Slow Matches", 1972), Brandstellen ("Scenes of Fires", 1974), Der Liedermacher (1982) and Für ewig und drei Tage ("For Ever and Three Days", 1999).

He was a cousin of the Catholic Archbishop of Paderborn, Johannes Joachim Degenhardt, who died in 2002. He was also the brother-in-law of the American-born illustrator Gertrude Degenhardt, who has designed many of his album covers for him. Degenhardt lived, until his death in 2011, in Quickborn, Kreis Pinneberg, in Schleswig-Holstein.

References

Further reading
 Jimmy Bowien (Record Producer)
   with discography and most song lyrics 
  Biography
 CDs available
 Homepage of his elder son Jan Degenhardt, also a singer-songwriter
 Homepage of his younger son , also a singer-songwriter

External links

 

1931 births
2011 deaths
People from Schwelm
People from the Province of Westphalia
Social Democratic Party of Germany politicians
German Communist Party politicians
German male  singer-songwriters
German male poets
German satirists
Writers from North Rhine-Westphalia
20th-century German novelists
20th-century German male writers
German male non-fiction writers
20th-century German male musicians